John Preston (born 31 March 1878) was an English professional rugby league footballer who played in the 1900s. He played at representative level for England and Lancashire, and at club level for Swinton and Warrington (Heritage № 123), as a forward (prior to the specialist positions of), during the era of contested scrums.

Playing career

International honours
Jack Preston won a cap for England while at Warrington in 1905 against Other Nationalities.

County Honours
Jack Preston made 2 appearances for Lancashire, in the 1904/5 season.

Club career
Jack Preston was a goal kicking forward signed in 1904 from Swinton. He played in Swinton's 1900 Challenge Cup final win over Salford.

Jack Preston made his début for Warrington on Saturday 10 September 1904, he missed the 6-0 victory over Hull Kingston Rovers in the 1905 Challenge Cup Final through a knee injury, and he made his last appearance for Warrington on Saturday 28 September 1907.

He made 103 appearances for Warrington, scoring 14 tries and kicking 89 goals for 220 points.

In 1905/6 season he played in the first 40 matches of the season, only missing the final league match of the season.

References

External links
Statistics at wolvesplayers.thisiswarrington.co.uk

1878 births
England national rugby league team players
English rugby league players
Lancashire rugby league team players
Place of birth missing
Place of death missing
Rugby league forwards
Rugby league players from Lancashire
Swinton Lions players
Warrington Wolves players
Year of death missing